Temple Beth Am (formerly: Olympic Jewish Center) is a historic Conservative synagogue in Los Angeles, California. Founded in 1935, it moved into a new building designed by one of the earliest African-American architects in Los Angeles, Ralph A. Vaughn, in 1959. In recent years, it has received significant donations from Holocaust survivor Sigi Ziering and his wife, Marilyn, whose names are on the building.

Location
The synagogue is located on the corner of Olympic Boulevard and La Cienega Boulevard in Los Angeles, just South of Beverly Hills.

History
Temple Beth Am was founded in 1935 as the Olympic Jewish Center. It is the third oldest Conservative synagogue in Los Angeles.

Jacob Pressman served as its rabbi from 1950 to 1985. Under his leadership, the synagogue took its current name, Temple Beth Am in 1957. It moved into a new building designed by the African-American architect, Ralph A. Vaughn, in 1959. In 1990, it celebrated its 55th anniversary.

In recent years, it has received significant donations from Holocaust survivor Sigi Ziering and his wife Marilyn, whose names are on the building. The current cantor is Rabbi Hillary Chorny. In 2012, the Sefer Torah nearly fell to the ground during a service. As this is seen a traumatic event in the Jewish faith, rabbi Adam Kligfeld requested that members of the congregation share among themselves forty days of fasting to recover.

Notable members
 George Konheim, real estate developer

References

External links
 

Synagogues in Los Angeles
Jewish organizations established in 1935
1935 establishments in California
Synagogues completed in 1959
Conservative synagogues in California
1959 establishments in California